Keith Aaron LeClair (February 26, 1966 – July 16, 2006) was an American athlete and later head baseball coach at Western Carolina University (Player, 1985–88 and Coach 1992–97).  During his playing days, LeClair played for former Clemson head baseball coach Jack Leggett at Western Carolina. He was an All-Southern Conference selection in 1988 while earning SoCon Tournament MVP honors the same season. The former walk-on established Catamount baseball records for hits and total bases in a season. LeClair played on four consecutive Southern Conference Championship Baseball teams (1985–88).  He ranked in the top 10 in six different WCU hitting categories while posting a career .375 batting average and was named MVP of the 1988 Southern Conference Tournament (batted .600/12 RBI).

LeClair signed with the Atlanta Braves after completing his collegiate career and spent the summer of 1988 as an outfielder for Idaho Falls in the Pioneer League. After a spring training stint with the San Francisco Giants in 1989, he was offered a student assistant coaching position at Western Carolina, which led to full-time responsibilities shortly thereafter.

He became Western Carolina's head coach in 1992 and coached the Catamounts to three Southern Conference tournament titles and three Southern Conference regular season titles. LeClair was a three time Southern Conference Coach of the Year with a career record at WCU of 228–135–2.

LeClair became the head baseball coach at East Carolina University in 1997, coaching there until he was forced to step down by illness in 2002.  LeClair became the second-winningest baseball coach in East Carolina history in just five seasons, compiling a 212–96–1 (.688) record.  He guided the Pirates to four straight NCAA Regional appearances, three Colonial Athletic Association championships and one Conference USA title. He won the American Baseball Coaches Association's East Region Coach-of-the-Year award in both 1999 and 2001.

He was inducted into both the East Carolina University and  Western Carolina Athletics Hall of Fame in the fall of 2002. LeClair was honored as the first recipient of the Conference USA Student-Athlete Advisory Committee's (SAAC) Coaches Choice Award. In addition, the Conference USA Baseball Coach-of-the-Year Award was named in honor of LeClair. Clark-LeClair Stadium opened on the campus of East Carolina University on March 4, 2005 and was named in honor of Coach LeClair and ECU alumnus Bill Clark. The Keith LeClair Classic has been played annually at East Carolina since 2004.

LeClair battled amyotrophic lateral sclerosis, commonly referred to as ALS or Lou Gehrig's Disease, for five years until his death on July 17, 2006.

Coaching Third: The Keith LeClair Story by Bethany Bradsher was published in 2010 (Whitecaps Media).

Head coaching record
The following is a table of Keith LeClair's yearly records as an NCAA head baseball coach.

References

External links
ECU Baseball official site
Coaching Third
Coaching Third: The Keith LeClair Story

East Carolina Pirates baseball coaches
Western Carolina University alumni
Western Carolina Catamounts baseball coaches
2006 deaths
1966 births